Sybra ordinata is a species of beetle in the family Cerambycidae. It was described by Henry Walter Bates in 1873.

Subspecies
 Sybra ordinata flavostriata Hayashi, 1968
 Sybra ordinata loochooana Breuning, 1939
 Sybra ordinata miyakojimana Hayashi, 1972
 Sybra ordinata okinoerabuensis Hayashi, 1972
 Sybra ordinata ordinata Bates, 1873
 Sybra ordinata subtesselata Breuning, 1960
 Sybra ordinata tokara Hayashi, 1956

References

ordinata
Beetles described in 1873